Oz Lotto is a national lottery game, owned by Tatts Group and administered by its lottery brand 'the Lott' in all Australian States with the exception of Western Australia, where the lottery is administered by Lotterywest. The draw takes place every Tuesday at approximately 8.30pm AEST. It was first introduced on 26 February 1994 and promoted as Australia's first fully national lottery game, at a time when New South Wales was not a part of the Australian Lotto Bloc. Each game costs $1.10 plus agent's commission.

Originally, the game was similar to Saturday Lotto, requiring six numbers to be picked out of 45. However, starting 18 October 2005, a seventh number began to be drawn, greatly lengthening the odds of winning Division 1. In line with this change, branding for Oz Lotto changed in many states, to emphasise the seventh ball (including new names, such as Super 7's Oz Lotto in Tatts regions, and Oz 7 Lotto in Queensland. However, as of 2012, the game has reverted to the branding of Oz Lotto in these regions). Oz Lotto guarantees a minimum division one prize pool of $2 million.

Oz Lotto reached its highest amount in 2012.  Originally guaranteed at $100 million, four winners shared a Division 1 pool of $111,972,151.04 in the draw on 6 November 2012.

On 17 May 2022, the Lott changed the game's matrix from 7/45 to 7/47, plus an additional supplementary number is also drawn.

Although the draw now requires seven numbers to be selected, the minimum prize level (of 3 winning numbers and one of the supplementary numbers) was unchanged, thus leading to seven prize divisions:

See also

Lotteries in Australia

References

Lotteries in Australia
1994 establishments in Australia
Gambling companies established in 1994